The speaker of the National Assembly is the presiding officer of the National Assembly of South Korea.

List of speakers

List of deputy speakers

Notes 

Politics of South Korea
South Korea
Speakers of the National Assembly